Serbian folk music ( / srpska narodna muzika) refers to, in the narrow sense, the "older" style of Serbian folk music, predating the "newer" ( / novokomponovana, "newly composed") style which emerged in the 1970s and 1980s as a result of urbanisation. The characteristic musical instruments included the accordion and violin, while traditional instruments such as tamburica, frula, were also used.

Notable performers

Male
Cune Gojković (1932–2017)
Predrag Živković Tozovac (1936–2021)
Miroslav Ilić (born 1950)
Staniša Stošić (1945–2008)
Sinan Sakić (1956–2018)
Šaban Šaulić (1951–2019)
Šeki Turković (born 1953)
Marinko Rokvić (1954–2021)

Female
Lepa Lukić (born 1940)
Snežana Đurišić (born 1959)
Merima Njegomir (1953–2021)
Vasilija Radojčić (1936–2011)
Brankica Vasić (Бранкица Васић), stage name Vasilisa
Lepa Brena (born 1960)
Zorica Brunclik (born 1955)

Notable songs
List of Serbian folk songs

Notable concerts
Tri majstora, December 1996, Radio Television of Serbia, (imdb)

See also
Starogradska muzika
Serbian folklore
Serbian dances
Serbian culture

References

External links

 
Folk music by country